Gowdru is a 2004 Kannada drama film directed by S. Mahendar. The film features Ambareesh, Devaraj and Shruti in the lead roles. Meena, B. Jaya and Ramesh Pandit feature in supporting roles. The film marks the 200th of Ambareesh and the 100th of Shruti. The film featured original score and soundtrack composed and written by Hamsalekha. The film is an unofficial remake of Tamil film Kizhakku Cheemayile.

Cast

Soundtrack

Hamsalekha composed the film's background score and music for its soundtrack. The album consists of six tracks.

Reception 
S. N. Deepak of Deccan Herald in his review of the film wrote, "The story, though not new, has its loads of sentimental scenes. The comic interludes are good." While commending the music and lyrics of the film's soundtrack, cinematography, dialogue and costumes on the film, he noted that "[a]t some points, scenes lack continuity..."

Awards
Karnataka State Film Awards
 Third Best Film
 Best Actress — Shruti
 Best Supporting Actress — B. Jaya

References

External links 
 
 Review

2004 films
2000s Kannada-language films
Films scored by Hamsalekha
Indian drama films
Kannada remakes of Tamil films
Films directed by S. Mahendar